The 2017 Dutch Open was the 45th edition of the Dutch Open. Mark McGeeney won the men's tournament whilst Deta Hedman won the women's. Current BDO World Champion Glen Durrant did not compete in the tournament.

Prize money
Winner     €5,000 (men), €2,250 (women)
Runner-up €2,500 (men), €1,250 (women)
Semi-finalist €1,250 (men), €750 (women)
Quarter-finalist €500 (men), €250 (women)
Last 16 €200 (men), €100 (women)
Last 32 €100 (men)

Last 32 – Men's draw

Women's draw

Darts in the Netherlands
2017 in darts